Studia Philosophica may refer to:
 Studia Philosophica (Czech Republic)
 Studia Philosophica Estonica
 Studia philosophica Gandensia
 Studia Philosophica (Poland)
 Studia Philosophica (Switzerland)
 Studia Philosophica Wratislaviensia